Bank of Maldives (BML) is the leading financial institution in Maldives inaugurated on November 11, 1982. They are a full-service bank engaging across personal, business and corporate financial services with over 300,000 customers. Bank of Maldives has a network of branches, agents, relationship managers and online banking facilities.

History
Bank of Maldives was inaugurated on November 11, 1982, and began commercial operation as a joint venture bank with 60% shares held by the Government of the Maldives (including its Agencies and Maldivian Companies) and 40% shares owned by International Finance Investment Company Limited (later IFIC Bank Limited), Dhaka, Bangladesh.
In December 1992, the Government decided to sell the Bank's shares to the general public. With this decision, Bank of Maldives became a public company on Janu160.

Bank of Maldives currently have nationwide network of 38 branches across all 20 atolls. The bank has 50 Self-Service Banking Centers, 115 ATMs, 277 agents and a full suite of Digital Banking services.

Customer service 
Services for personal customers include Accounts, Loans, Credit Cards, Debit Cards, Internet Banking, and Mobile Banking through a nationwide network. Services for businesses include Accounts, Loans, Card Acquiring, Trade Services, Payment Gateway, and E-Banking.

Islamic banking
Bank of Maldives launched Islamic banking services under the name "BML Islamic" on 22 January 2015.

Bank of Maldives continues to introduce Shari’ah compliant alternatives to their conventional products with the introduction of financing product and a competitive alternative for business customers. In 2019, BML Islamic introduced three new Savings and Investment Accounts for personal and business customers.

Customer deposits are maintained in a separate fund that is utilized exclusively for Shari’ah compliant purposes, overseen by the Bank's Shari’ah Advisory Committee which includes internationally renowned Shari’ah scholars in the field of Islamic finance.

References

Economy of the Maldives
Organisations based in the Maldives
1982 establishments in the Maldives
Banks of the Maldives